Shaglyteniz or Shagalalyteniz is a lake in Akkayin and Taiynsha districts, North Kazakhstan Region, Kazakhstan.

The villages of Barykol, Kurya, Intaly, Elizavetinka and Kuchkovka lie near the lakeshore. Road P-249 runs close to the northern end of Shaglyteniz. The lake and its adjacent marshes are an important bird area, but much under threat owing to human interaction.

Geography
Shaglyteniz lies in the southern part of the Ishim Plain, southwest of the Russian border. It is one of the main lakes of the region. It is an endorheic lake located at the bottom of a depression. Lakes Kalibek and Kishi-Karoy lie to the east, but Shaglyteniz is the only lake in the area where the water is relatively fresh.

The lake is surrounded by a strip of marshes and ponds. The Shagalaly river flows into the lake from the south.

Flora and fauna
There are large sections of reeds, bulrushes and sedges growing on the lakeshore. The red-breasted goose, as well as species of ducks, waders and gulls, may be found at the lake. The main fish species in Shaglyteniz is crucian carp.

See also
List of lakes of Kazakhstan

References

External links

Open season. Cop Shaglyteniz around the lake.
Expeditions along the watersheds of the middle forest-steppe of the Omsk region (in Russian)
ИНТЕЛЛЕКТУАЛЬНАЯ НАЦИЯ В ФОКУСЕ ГУМАНИТАРНЫХ ТЕХНОЛОГИЙ (in Russian)
THE ORIGIN OF THE DEPRESSION LAKE SYSTEMS TENIZ - NORTHERN KAZAKHSTAN

Lakes of Kazakhstan
Endorheic lakes of Asia
North Kazakhstan Region
West Siberian Plain
Important Bird Areas of Kazakhstan